Pénestin is a commune in the Morbihan department of Brittany in north-western France. Inhabitants of Pénestin are called in French Pénestinois.

Geography
The mouth of the river Vilaine forms a natural bourndary to the north. Historically, Pénestin belongs to Lower Brittany. As Penestin lies on the coast, it boasts several beaches, the most popular of which are La Mine d'Or and Loscolo.

Map

Language

Until the beginning of the nineteen's century, the spoken language was breton. Most of the hamlets have breton names.

Tourism

Pénestin is a very popular seaside resort. 71.1% of the properties are holiday homes, one of the highest percentage in Morbihan.

See also
La Baule - Guérande Peninsula
Communes of the Morbihan department

References

External links

Official website 
 Mayors of Morbihan Association 

Communes of Morbihan